Aa Okkati Adakku is a 1992 Indian Telugu-language comedy film written and directed by E. V. V. Satyanarayana, and produced by M. Saravanan and M. Balasubramaniam under the AVM Productions banner. It stars Rajendra Prasad, Rambha, and Rao Gopal Rao with the music composed by Ilaiyaraaja. The film is the debut of Rambha in the Telugu film industry.

The film was successful at the box office. The film was a remake of Tamil film Paaru Paaru Pattanam Paaru. It was remade in Hindi as Mr. and Mrs. Khiladi (1997) and in Kannada as Bal Nan Maga.

Plot 
Chitti Babu strongly believes in astrology and spends a lazy life. Rambha, with whom he falls in love, pressures him to marry her before her father, Royyala Naidu, finds an alliance of his choice. Naidu, out of love for his daughter, agrees for the marriage on the condition that he earn  1 lakh by the night of the wedding. Chitti Babu starts cheating people to earn money. Royyala Naidu finds out about the deception and insults Chitti Babu's mother. Chitti Babu realizes the importance of money in life and finds employment in a garment factory which is in the loss and makes it successful and earns 1 lakh rupees. Royyala Naidu relents after seeing that Chitti Babu has become a hard-working honest man and gets the lovebirds married. Chitti Babu lives happily with his wife.

Cast 
Rajendra Prasad as Atukula Chitti Babu
Rambha as Rambha
Rao Gopal Rao as Royyala Naidu / Godavari Gangaraju
Allu Ramalingaiah as Sahadevudu
Brahmanandam as Addu Pulla Rao
Babu Mohan as Poompuhar
Sakshi Ranga Rao as Pellilla Peraiah
Kallu Chidambaram as Chidambaram
Chidathala Appa Rao as Rikshavadu
Kadambari Kiran
Prudhviraj as Bose Babu
Radha Kumari as Sahadevudu's wife
Lathasri as Kunthi
Annuja as Kannaamba
Nirmalamma as Chitti Babu's mother

Soundtrack 

Music composed by Ilaiyaraaja, this was his only collaboration with E. V. V. Satyanarayana.  Music released on AKASH Audio Company. The song "Pavurama" was based on Ilayaraja's own song "Shenbagame" from Enga Ooru Paattukaran.

Impact
In 2017, Rao Gopal Rao's son Rao Ramesh played Royyalu Naidu in the film DJ: Duvvada Jagannadham, which is based on and named after Gopal Rao's character in the film.

References

External links 
 
 Listen to Aa Okkadi Adakku songs at Raaga.com

1992 films
Indian romantic comedy films
Films scored by Ilaiyaraaja
Films directed by E. V. V. Satyanarayana
AVM Productions films
1990s Telugu-language films
1992 comedy films
Telugu films remade in other languages